A Jazz Holiday  is a jazz compilation released in 1973. It contains tracks recorded between 1928 and 1934 by Benny Goodman, Ben Pollack, Red Nichols, Ted Lewis, Irving Mills, Jack Pettis, Rube Bloom, The Charleston Chasers, and The Venuti-Lang All Star Orchestra.

Track listing
 "A Jazz Holiday" – Benny Goodman's Boys
 "'Deed I Do" – Ben Pollack & His Orchestra
 "Buy, Buy For Baby" – Ben Pollack & His Park Central Orchestra
 "Bashful Baby" – Ben Pollack & His Park Central Orchestra
 "Yellow Dog Blues" – Ben's Bad Boys
 "Dinah" – Red Nichols & His Five Pennies
 "Carolina In The Morning" – Red Nichols & His Five Pennies
 "Who" – Red Nichols & His Five Pennies
 "How Come You Do Me Like You Do?" – Red Nichols & His Five Pennies
 "Royal Garden Blues" – Ted Lewis And His Band
 "I'm Crazy 'Bout My Baby" – Ted Lewis And His Band
 "Crazy 'Bout My Gal" – Irving Mills And His Orchestra
 "Railroad Man" – Irving Mills And His Orchestra
 "Sweetest Melody" – Jack Pettis & His Orchestra
 "Mysterious Mose" – Rube Bloom & His Bayou Boys
 "That's A Plenty" – Benny Goodman
 "Clarinetitis" – Benny Goodman
 "Jungle Blues" – Benny Goodman's Boys
 "Room 1411" – Benny Goodman's Boys
 "Blue" – Benny Goodman's Boys
 "After A While" – Benny Goodman's Boys
 "Basin Street Blues" – The Charleston Chasers
 "Farewell Blues" – The Venuti-Lang All Star Orchestra

References

1973 compilation albums
Benny Goodman albums